Yakubu Mohammed (born 26 July 1990) is a Ghanaian footballer who plays as a forward for the Equatorial Guinean club Futuro Kings FC. He is also a former member of the Ghana national team.

References

External links

1990 births
Living people
Ghanaian footballers
Ghana international footballers
Association football forwards
Ghana Premier League players
Ashanti Gold SC players
Asante Kotoko S.C. players
South African Premier Division players
Maritzburg United F.C. players
Botola players
Raja CA players
Futuro Kings FC players
Ghanaian expatriate footballers
Ghanaian expatriate sportspeople in South Africa
Expatriate soccer players in South Africa
Ghanaian expatriate sportspeople in Morocco
Expatriate footballers in Morocco
Ghanaian expatriate sportspeople in Equatorial Guinea
Expatriate footballers in Equatorial Guinea
Elmina Sharks F.C. players